{{Infobox person
| name               = Edward Barnes
| honorific_suffix   = 
| image              = 
| birth_name         = Edward Canpbell Barnes
| birth_date         = 
| birth_place        = 
| death_date         = 
| nationality        = British
| known_for          = {{Unbulleted list|Presenting:|Newsround|Blue Peter}}
| employer           = BBC
| occupation         = Television executive and producer
}}

Edward Campbell Barnes (8 October 1928 – 8 September 2021) was a British television executive, and producer at the BBC. He was credited with creating the children's television programme Newsround.

Biography
Barnes was a co-creator of Blue Peter in 1958, and the programme's assistant director. Later, he was a producer of the series. It was Barnes, with colleague Biddy Baxter, who in late 1962 toured London pet shops after the show's mongrel puppy  died and a clandestine substitute (soon known as Petra) was needed so as not to needlessly upset young viewers. Barnes was the originator of the longstanding children's television news programme Newsround, in April 1972; originally, it was known as John Craven's Newsround. At the time, he was Deputy Head of Children's Television at the BBC. Newsround was created to explain stories to children that would not be comprehended equally well on the main news. It was met with resistance when he formulated it, and was a controversial idea for some of his colleagues. Newsround was the first to bring the Space Shuttle Challenger disaster to British television on 28 January 1986. Barnes' wife was the writer Dorothy Smith, who was a contributor to Blue Peter''. The couple, who had three children, were married from 1950 until Smith's death in 1992.

Death 
He died on 7 September 2021, at the age of 92.

References

External links
 Interview in January 2015
 BBC Archive
 

1928 births
2021 deaths
BBC executives
BBC television producers
Blue Peter